A dead hedge is a barrier constructed from cut branches, saplings, and foliage. The material can be gathered from activities such as pruning or clearing, and in traditional forms of woodland management, such as coppicing. Its ecological succession can be a beetle bank or hedge.

Restoration ecology and biological pest control 
In coppicing, dead hedges are useful for keeping compartments of a coppice tidy, and keeping the public from certain areas. At the same time, they can provide excellent habitats and corridors for wildlife habitat conservation and restoration ecology. They offer habitats for insects such as beetles, and shelter and feeding opportunities for small mammals and birds. Dead hedges can be used to create habitats for natural 'biological control agents' to provide biological pest control. They have roles in the tending of natural landscapes, wildlife gardening, and organic gardening.

Agriculture
Dead hedges can provide enclosures for livestock. They can also play a role in biological pest control (for example, in organic farming and sustainable agriculture).

Dead hedges provide a carbon-efficient way of recycling biomass, without the need for transport or burning.

Gallery

See also
 Beetle bank
 Biodiversity
 Coarse woody debris
 Hedge laying
 Hibernaculum (zoology)
 Insect hotel
 Windrow (dead hedges may be thought of as "tidy wind-rows")

References

External links

Agricultural terminology
Habitat management equipment and methods
Biological pest control
Environmental conservation